Anita Brandt-Burgoyne is an American film editor.

Filmography
Payback (1995)
A Kid in King Arthur's Court (1995)
A Very Brady Sequel (1996)
Good Burger (1997)
I'll Be Home for Christmas (1998)
Legally Blonde (2001)
Cadet Kelly (2002)
Confessions of a Teenage Drama Queen (2004)
My Sassy Girl (2008)
Queen Sized (2008)
Amish Grace (2010)
A Good Old Fashioned Orgy (2011)
That's What She Said (2012)
Jinxed (2013)
Swindle (2013)
Return to Zero (2014)
Saint Judy (2018)

References

Living people
American film editors
Year of birth missing (living people)